In mathematics, a graded vector space is a vector space that has the extra structure of a grading or a gradation, which is a decomposition of the vector space into a direct sum of vector subspaces.

Integer gradation 
Let  be the set of non-negative integers. An -graded vector space, often called simply a graded vector space without the prefix , is a vector space  together with a decomposition into a direct sum of the form

 
where each  is a vector space.

Graded vector spaces are common.  For example the set of all polynomials in one or several variables forms a graded vector space, where the homogeneous elements of degree n are exactly the linear combinations of monomials of degree n.

General gradation
The subspaces of a graded vector space need not be indexed by the set of natural numbers, and may be indexed by the elements of any set I.  An I-graded vector space V is a vector space together with a decomposition into a direct sum of subspaces indexed by elements i of the set I:
 

The case where I is the ring  (the elements 0 and 1) is particularly important in physics. A -graded vector space is also known as a supervector space.

Homomorphisms

For general index sets I, a linear map between two I-graded vector spaces  is called a graded linear map if it preserves the grading of homogeneous elements. A graded linear map is also called a homomorphism (or morphism) of graded vector spaces, or homogeneous linear map:

   for all i in I.

For a fixed field and a fixed index set, the graded vector spaces form a category whose morphisms are the graded linear maps.

When I is a commutative monoid (such as the natural numbers), then one may more generally define linear maps that are homogeneous of any degree i in I by the property

   for all j in I,

where "+" denotes the monoid operation. If moreover I satisfies the cancellation property so that it can be embedded into an abelian group A that it generates (for instance the integers if I is the natural numbers), then one may also define linear maps that are homogeneous of degree i in A by the same property (but now "+" denotes the group operation in A). Specifically, for i in I a linear map will be homogeneous of degree −i if

   for all j in I, while
   if  is not in I.

Just as the set of linear maps from a vector space to itself forms an associative algebra (the algebra of endomorphisms of the vector space), the sets of homogeneous linear maps from a space to itself – either restricting degrees to I or allowing any degrees in the group A – form associative graded algebras over those index sets.

Operations on graded vector spaces
Some operations on vector spaces can be defined for graded vector spaces as well.

Given two I-graded vector spaces V and W, their direct sum has underlying vector space V ⊕ W with gradation
(V ⊕ W)i = Vi ⊕ Wi .

If I is a semigroup, then the tensor product of two I-graded vector spaces V and W is another I-graded vector space, with gradation

Hilbert–Poincaré series

Given a -graded vector space that is finite-dimensional for every  its Hilbert–Poincaré series is the formal power series

From the formulas above, the Hilbert–Poincaré series of a direct sum and of a tensor product 
of graded vector spaces (finite dimensional in each degree) are respectively the sum and the product of the corresponding Hilbert–Poincaré series.

See also
 Graded (mathematics)
 Graded algebra
 Comodule
 Graded module
 Littlewood–Richardson rule

References
 Bourbaki, N. (1974) Algebra I (Chapters 1-3), Chapter 2, Section 11; Chapter 3.

Categories in category theory
Vector spaces